Derek Thomas Allan (born 24 December 1974) is a Scottish former football defender.

He is currently the coach of Greenock Morton's U17 side.

Playing career
Allan or ("Swan Neck") (Due to his aerial ability) was born in Irvine, Scotland and started his professional career at Ayr United, where he made only five appearances. After just one year at the club he was sold to Southampton of the English Premiership for a fee of £75,000 in March 1993. He also was part of the Scottish Under 21 squad in April 1993 which played Iceland at Rugby Park, Kilmarnock.

Southampton's manager Ian Branfoot saw Allan as "one for the future" but a series of injuries restricted him to just one Premier League appearance when he came on as a late substitute for Matthew Bound in a 1–0 defeat at Manchester City on 1 May 1993.

In March 1996 Jimmy Case took him on loan to Brighton & Hove Albion, before making the move permanent. In the three years he spent at Brighton he made 67 league appearances, scoring twice. Allan joined non-league side Kingstonian and was player of the year in the 1999–00 season. Allan had a successful spell at Kingsmeadow, being part of the winning 2000 FA Trophy squad beating Kettering Town 3-2 in a dramatic 2000 Wembley Final, which turned out to be one of the last games ever played at the 'Old Wembley'. 68 appearances in 2 seasons 

In July 2001 he was signed by Scottish side Queen of the South where he won the Scottish League One Title in May 2002. His stay was again hampered by injuries and he was limited to just 47 league appearances. Allan spent the last season of his career at Dumbarton, before early retirement at the age of just 30.

Derek is now the Elite Youth Coach at Greenock Morton Under 17s and a fully UEFA Qualified 'A' licence Youth Coach.

Career statistics

References

External links

1974 births
Living people
Scottish footballers
Ayr United F.C. players
Southampton F.C. players
Brighton & Hove Albion F.C. players
Queen of the South F.C. players
Dumbarton F.C. players
Kingstonian F.C. players
Association football defenders
Premier League players
English Football League players
Scottish Football League players
Greenock Morton F.C. non-playing staff
Scotland youth international footballers